Baroness Williams may refer to:
* Shirley Williams, Baroness Williams of Crosby (1930–2021), British politician and academic
 Susan Williams, Baroness Williams of Trafford (born 1967), British Conservative politician

See also 
 Lord Williams (disambiguation)